Janine Pommy Vega (February 5, 1942 – December 23, 2010) was an American poet associated with the Beats.

Early life
Janine Pommy was born in Jersey City, New Jersey. Her father worked as a milkman in the mornings and a carpenter in the afternoons. At the age of sixteen, inspired by Jack Kerouac On the Road, she went with a friend to the Cedar Tavern in Greenwich Village, where they met Gregory Corso; in 1960, after graduating as valedictorian of her high school class, she moved in with Allen Ginsberg and Peter Orlovsky.

Career
She worked as a waitress and wrote Beat-inspired experimental poetry. In December 1962, she married the Peruvian painter  in Israel and moved with him to Paris, where she collected money for street musicians and modeled at the École des Beaux-Arts. After Vega's sudden death in Ibiza in 1965, she returned to the United States and moved to California. Her first book, Poems to Fernando, was published by City Lights in 1968 in their City Lights Pocket Poets Series, the third volume by a woman. 

In the 1970s and 1980s Vega traveled widely, trekking in the Himalayas and living in Peru, Colombia, and Bolivia, including two years as a hermit on the Isla del Sol in Lake Titicaca on the Bolivian-Peruvian border, where she completed Journal of a Hermit (1974) and Morning Passage (1976). Tracking the Serpent: Journeys to Four Continents (1997) chronicles her 1980s travels to centers of ancient matriarchy.

In addition to her own books of poetry, the last of which was The Green Piano (2005), Vega was widely anthologized, including in City Lights Pocket Poets Anthology and Women of the Beat Generation. She also toured with a band called Tiamalu, performing in English and Spanish.

Teaching
Vega taught in schools in English and Spanish through arts in education programs including Teachers & Writers Collaborative, Poets in the Schools, Arts/Genesis, and New York City Ballet, and beginning in the mid-1970s in prisons through Incisions/Arts, becoming its director in 1987, and later through the Bard Prison Initiative run by Bard College. She served on the PEN Prison Writing Committee.

Later life and death
From 1999, Vega lived with poet Andy Clausen. On December 23, 2010, she died at home in Willow, New York, of a heart attack.

Awards
She won two Golda Awards, the second for The Green Piano, and was awarded many grants, including an annual grant from the New York State Council on the Arts for her work in prisons through Incisions/Arts.

Works
 Poems to Fernando (1968)
 Journal of a Hermit (1974); repr. with Under The Sky
 Morning Passage (1976)
 Here at the Door (1978)
 The Bard Owl (1980)
 Skywriting (1988)
 Apex of The Earth's Way (1984)
 Drunk on a Glacier, Talking to Flies (1988)
 Island of the Sun (1991)
 Threading the Maze (1992)
 Red Bracelets (1993)
 Tracking the Serpent: Journeys to Four Continents (1997)
 The Road to Your House Is A Mountain Road (1995)
 The Walker (2003)
 Mad Dogs of Trieste: New & Selected Poems (2000)
 The Green Piano (2005)

References

External links
Website
Janine Pommy-Vega (1942-2010): cyber tombeau by poet Pierre Joris, including the opening poem of Poems to Fernando and a homage-poem by Valery Oişteanu, "The Drum Circle for Janine Pommy Vega".

1942 births
2010 deaths
People from Union City, New Jersey
Beat Generation writers
Modernist women writers
Poets from New Jersey
Poets from New York (state)
American women poets
20th-century American poets
20th-century American women writers
21st-century American women